Raoul Manselli (1917–1984) was an Italian historian.

1917 births
1984 deaths
20th-century Italian historians
Corresponding Fellows of the Medieval Academy of America